Mohamed Noureddine Abdusalam Zubya (born March 20, 1989) is a Libyan footballer who plays for Al-Ittihad Tripoli.

Club career
Born in Tripoli, he was playing with Aschat S.C. when he moved in 2006 to Al-Ittihad where he stayed until 2011 and where he won 4 successive Libyan Premier League championships.

In 2007 Zubya was handed a one-year ban by CAF for trying to assault the assistant referee in his side's CAF Champions League match against FAR Rabat of Morocco. He returned after a six-month suspension and scored two goals. in the Libyan SuperCup final against Al Akhdar.

In August 2011, Zubya sign for Al Arabi Kuwait.

On June 11, Zubya agreed a four-year contract with Serbian team Partizan. After passing medical exams and after reaching an agreement with Al-Arabi, Zubya officially signed on June 12 and was prepared to join his new teammates as it was designated as priority by Partizan manager Vladimir Vermezović to have the team complete as soon as possible to start preparing the team for the UEFA Champions League qualification which were a little more than a month away.

Zubya made his debut for Partizan in club's first official match of the season, on July 17, 2012, in a 2012–13 UEFA Champions League second qualifying round first-leg match, away, against Valletta.

Zubya was released from his Partizan contract in January 2013. He is also known for being the only individual with the surname "Zubya" in Libya, with the only other recipient of that surname in the world living in India.

In November 2013, Zubya sign for JS Kabylie.

He then played with Esperance Sportive de Tunis in the Tunisian Ligue Professionnelle 1.

International career
Zubya played for the Libyan national team in the 2010 FIFA World Cup qualifiers.

International goals
Scores and results list Libya's goal tally first.

Honours

Clubs
Al Ittihad Tripoli
Libyan Premier League (5): 2007, 2008, 2009, 2010, 2021
Libyan Cup (3): 2007, 2009, 2018
Libyan SuperCup (4): 2007, 2008, 2009, 2010
Al Arabi Kuwait
Kuwait Crown Cup: 2011–12
Partizan
Serbian SuperLiga: 2012–13
Riffa SC
Bahraini Premier League: 2014
Esperance Tunis
Tunisian Ligue Professionnelle 1: 2016–17

Individual
Algerian Ligue Professionnelle 1 best goalscorer with MC Oran (13 goals): 2015-16

References

External links

Player Profile @ Goalzz.com

1989 births
Living people
Libyan footballers
Libya international footballers
Association football forwards
Al-Ittihad Club (Tripoli) players
Libyan expatriate footballers
Al-Arabi SC (Kuwait) players
FK Partizan players
Serbian SuperLiga players
Expatriate footballers in Kuwait
Expatriate footballers in Algeria
Expatriate footballers in Tunisia
Expatriate footballers in Serbia
Libyan expatriate sportspeople in Tunisia
Libyan expatriate sportspeople in Kuwait
Libyan expatriate sportspeople in Algeria
Libyan expatriate sportspeople in Serbia
JS Kabylie players
MC Oran players
Algerian Ligue Professionnelle 1 players
People from Tripoli, Libya
Kuwait Premier League players
Libyan Premier League players